"Hello Mom" is a single co-written by Terry Carisse and performed by Canadian country music group the Mercey Brothers. The song peaked at number 1 on the RPM Country Tracks chart on June 19, 1971. It also reached number 1 on the RPM Adult Contemporary chart.

Chart performance

References

1971 singles
Mercey Brothers songs
1971 songs
Songs written by Terry Carisse